Lo  (sometimes wrongly spelled Loh) is an island in the Torres group of islands, in northern Vanuatu. The island is located 2.25 miles from the Toga Island. As of 2009, the population of the island was 210. They speak the Lo dialect of the Lo-Toga language.

Transportation
The Torres islands are served by Torres Airport, which is located on the Linua island, just off the north coast of Lo. The airport is mostly used by Lo residents. Lo is not frequently visited by outsiders.

Villages
Lo has two main villages: Lun̄haregi  (a.k.a. Lunghariki) and Rinuhe ; and a smaller hamlet, Telaqlaq . In 2018, the Vanuatu Coastal Adaptation Project provided the villages with access to fresh water.

Name
The name Lo comes from the Lo-Toga language, where it is spelt Lō .

References

Islands of Vanuatu
Archipelagoes of the Pacific Ocean
Torba Province